Pharmacological Reviews is a quarterly peer-reviewed scientific journal publishing review articles on all aspects of pharmacology and related topics. It is published by the American Society for Pharmacology and Experimental Therapeutics. The editor-in-chief is Eric Barker (Purdue College of Pharmacy).

According to the Journal Citation Reports, the journal has a 2020 impact factor of 25.468.  , this title was known for having the "most exhaustive surveys" among six titles devoted to reviews in the pharmacology discipline.

References

External links

Pharmacology journals
Publications established in 1949
Quarterly journals
English-language journals
Academic journals published by learned and professional societies
Review journals